Bouvancourt is a commune in the French department of Marne, region of Grand Est, northeastern France.

Population

See also
Communes of the Marne department

References

Communes of Marne (department)